InVader is the fourth album by Finnish glam metal band Reckless Love, released on 4 March 2016 through Spinefarm Records.

Track listing
All songs written by Olli Herman, Pepe Reckless, and Ikka Wirtanen, unless otherwise noted.

Reception

Writing for Classic Rock, Johnny Sharp pointed out the pop elements of several songs as "flagrant attempts to make radio-friendly sing-alongs" and ultimately said "we realise all this, as someone once sang, ain't nothin' but a good time. That's what they'll tell the taste police anyway."

On Dangerdog, Craig Hartranft said the boys "write some quality rock n roll tunes. Damn catchy rock n roll tunes", praised their individual performances and said "it's probably fair to say that there's not a single bad song on this album".

Nick Balazs from Brave Words & Bloody Knuckles also noted the pop and even rap incursions of the band, but felt they "retain the fun, positive-natured attitude of Reckless Love". He concluded his review by saying: "Some of these newer sounds on InVader are questionable, but I absolutely commend a band for not resting on their laurels and trying something new."

An unsigned review by Ultimate Guitar's team states that the album "shows the members of this vicious group leaning closer and closer towards a more mainstream sound [...] by blending aggressive rock guitar with melodic refrains and a plush production." They said the final impression with InVader is "how Reckless Love were able to once again achieve that vintage rock sound" and concluded by saying that "the album retains enough of their signature glam metal attitude to remain standout [...] there are enough memorable moments throughout "InVader" to catch the interest of familiar listeners and constitute picking a copy up for their own collection."

In a less positive review, Sea of Tranquility's Steven Reid said "the Reckless lads made no secret out of their desire to broaden their sound, however I can't say I expected that to result in an album so throwaway, so lightweight, so utterly lacking in the rock that made this band's name, that it's barely recognisable." He went on to say that InVader "possesses three or four songs that stand up to repeat listens. The rest? Well, it isn't even particularly good pop music and in the throwaway stakes it's as here today and gone tomorrow as space hoppers and deely boppers."

Chart performance

Personnel
Reckless Love
Olli Herman – lead vocals
Pepe Reckless – lead guitar
Hessu Maxx – drums
Jalle Verne – bass guitar
Produced by Ikka Wirtanen

References

2016 albums
Reckless Love albums
Spinefarm Records albums